The following is a list of episodes for the Australian television programme, Packed to the Rafters.

Series overview

Episodes

Season 1 (2008–09)

Season 2 (2009)

Season 3 (2010)

Season 4 (2011–12)

Season 5 (2012–13)

Season 6 (2013)

Ratings

References

Lists of Australian comedy television series episodes
Lists of Australian drama television series episodes